Fantom is an online sticker album publisher and software developer founded in 2009. It is a privately owned company based in Dublin, Ireland. The company both sells the software platform to brands and licenses content onto its platform to create online sticker albums. The Fantom Online Sticker Album platform was launched in April 2012, using content from the US Impact Wrestling franchise.
The company began life as a social media tool for politics, under the brand iCitizen. When this proved not to be a commercial idea the founders pivoted into the newly defined digital collectibles space. It won a place on the inaugural DCU Propeller Venture Accelerator in 2011, securing a €30,000 investment in the company. Later that year a full Seed Fund round was completed bringing the total of outside investment in the company to €490,000. Investors include the Irish government agency Enterprise Ireland, the AIB Seed Capital Fund and a number of private investors: Kevin Neary, and Bloom Equity (Conor Stanley and Tadhg O'Toole).

Clients 
Several English soccer clubs use the Fantom platform as a digital engagement tool on their Facebook pages. These include Queens Park Rangers, Derby County FC, and Wolverhampton Wanderers.

Licences 
As of January 2018 Fantom held the following licences:

 Adote Abrolhos
 Fifth Harmony
 Guinness World Records
 King John's Castle

Own brand content 
The company also develops its own sticker album content, with decks covering Countries, Endangered Animals, Space and Concept Cars.

Software engine 
The Fantom publishing platform is a suite of tools for creating online sticker albums, built in PHP and MySQL.

References

External links 
 

Trading card companies
Companies based in Dublin (city)